Damir Rančić (born 23 June 1983) is a Croatian basketball coach and former professional player who currently coaches Ribola Kaštela of the Prva liga.

Pro career
Rančić was born in Split and began his professional career in 2000 with Solin. He then moved to Split in 2001. In 2005, he moved to Cibona Zagreb. He then joined Panellinios, before going to Kyiv. He then returned to Panellinios before moving to Zadar. In 2010, he joined Obradoiro CAB, before returning once again to Panellinios, but left the team soon after for personal reasons.

After retiring as player due to chronicle back problems, in October 2018 he took up coaching Ribola Kaštela, a club he formerly played for.

Croatian national team
Rančić was a member of the Croatian junior national teams. He played at the 1999 FIBA Europe Under-16 Championship. He has also been a member of the senior men's Croatian national basketball team. He played at the EuroBasket 2005 and he won the gold medal at the 2009 Mediterranean Games, where he was also voted the tournament's MVP.

References

External links
Euroleague.net Profile
Eurobasket.com Profile
Adriatic League Profile
Spanish League Profile 
Greek League Profile 

1983 births
Living people
ABA League players
BC Kyiv players
Competitors at the 2009 Mediterranean Games
Croatian men's basketball players
Greek Basket League players
KK Cibona players
KK Kaštela players
KK Split players
KK Zadar players
KK Zagreb players
Liga ACB players
Mediterranean Games gold medalists for Croatia
Obradoiro CAB players
Panellinios B.C. players
Shooting guards
Small forwards
Soproni KC players
Basketball players from Split, Croatia
Mediterranean Games medalists in basketball
Helios Suns players